The 1966 Individual Speedway World Championship was the 21st edition of the official World Championship to determine the world champion rider.

In the final in Göteborg New Zealander Barry Briggs equalled the record of Ove Fundin by winning his fourth World title. Norwegian Sverre Harrfeldt took silver and Pole Antoni Woryna took bronze. Ivan Mauger, a 26-year-old New Zealander who had won the European Final qualifier finished fourth.

Format changes
The format of the Championship changed for the 1966 event. With the final to be held in Sweden, six riders from Sweden would be eligible for the World Final by finishing in the top six of the Swedish finals. The remaining Scandinavian riders were pooled in with the British and Commonwealth riders and then the Continental riders, who ultimately would have only 10 places for the World Final.

Two Swedish finals were held during 1966, the three race qualifying for the World Final and another held on 7 October that was separate from the World Championship.

First round
British & Commonwealth Qualifying - 16 to British & Commonwealth Final

British & Commonwealth Qualifying

Second round
British & Commonwealth Final - 8 to British/Commonwealth/Scandinavian Final
Nordic Final - 8 to British/Commonwealth/Scandinavian Final
Continental Qualifying - 16 to Continental Final

British & Commonwealth Final
 June 27, 1966
 Wimbledon
 First 8 to British/Commonwealth/Scandinavian Final plus 1 reserve

Nordic Final
19 May 1966
 Hillerød
 First 8 to British/Commonwealth/Scandinavian Final plus 1 reserve

Continental Qualifying

Third round
Swedish Qualifying - 16 to Swedish Final
Continental Final - 8 to European Final
British/Commonwealth/Scandinavian Final - 8 to European Final

Swedish Qualifying

Continental Final
 June 25, 1966
 Slany
 First 8 to European Final plus 1 reserve

British/Commonwealth/Scandinavian Final
 July 14, 1966
 Sheffield
 First 8 to European Final plus 1 reserve

Fourth round
Swedish Finals - 6 to World Final
European Final - 10 to World Final

Swedish Finals
Three races held on 31 May at Borås, 1 June at Linköping and 2 June in Göteborg

European Final
 September 3, 1966
 Wembley
 First 10 to World Final plus 1 reserve

World Final
September 23, 1966
 Göteborg, Ullevi

References

1966
Speedway
World
Speedway competitions in Poland